Goldman's woodrat (Neotoma goldmani) is a rodent species in the family Cricetidae.
It is found only in Mexico throughout the Mexican Plateau, stretching from southeastern Chihuahua to southern San Luis Potosí and northern Querétaro. The plateau is an average 5,988 ft. above sea level and covers a land area of 232,388 sq. miles.

N. goldmani is restricted to rocky and desert habitats and shelters itself in crevices. It exhibits a karyotype that qualifies it as a more primitive species than the N. mexicana.

It is currently under no immediate threat, but has experienced a decrease in population due to habitat changes occurring throughout the Mexican Plateau area, a very highly populated area, which includes the states of Chihuahua, San Luis Potosí, Jalisco, and Mexico.

References

 Baillie, J. 1996.   Neotoma goldmani.   2006 IUCN Red List of Threatened Species.   Downloaded on 19 July 2007.
Musser, G. Gxonomic and Geographic Reference. D. E. Wilson and D. M. Reeder eds. Johns Hopkins University Press, Baltimore.
de Grammont, P.C. & Cuarón, A. 2008. Neotoma goldmani. In: IUCN 2012. IUCN Red List of Threatened Species. Version 2012.2. <www.iucnredlist.org>. Downloaded on 24 April 2013.
Harris, C. P., & McCullough, D. A. (1988). G-banded karyotype of neotoma goldmani. The Southwestern Naturalist, 33(2), 236–239.
Hrachovy, S. K., Bradley, R. D. and Jones, C. 1996. Neotoma goldmani. Mammalian Species 545: 1–3.

Goldman's woodrat
Endemic mammals of Mexico
Mexican Plateau
Mammals described in 1903
Taxonomy articles created by Polbot
Taxa named by Clinton Hart Merriam